Beinaičiai (formerly) is a village in Kėdainiai district municipality, in Kaunas County, in central Lithuania. According to the 2011 census, the village had a population of 267 people. There is a library and a former school.

History
There was Beinaičiai village and folwark in the beginning of the 20th century.

During the Soviet times, Beinaičiai was a kolkhoz center.

Demography

References

Villages in Kaunas County
Kėdainiai District Municipality